The 1896 Buchtel football team represented Buchtel College (later renamed as the University of Akron) in the 1896 college football season. The team was led by first-year head coach Harry Wilson. They were outscored by their lone opponent 0–32 and finished with a record of 0 wins and 1 loss (0–1).

Schedule

References

Buchtel
Akron Zips football seasons
College football winless seasons
Buchtel football